Joculator thielei is a species of minute sea snail, a marine gastropod mollusc in the family Cerithiopsidae. The species was described by Jay and Drivas in 2002.

References

Gastropods described in 2002
thielei